ZMA may refer to:

Science and technology
 ZMA (supplement), a bodybuilding supplement
 Zone Multicast Address

Organizations
 Zavod Malolitrazhnykh Avtomobiley, a Russian small-car maker
 Zoölogisch Museum Amsterdam, Zoological Museum of the University of Amsterdam
 Miami Air Route Traffic Control Center (abbreviated ZMA), US